Classical Baby is an American animated television series for young children and families directed by Amy Schatz and produced by HBO. The animation was created and designed by Maciek Albrecht and MaGiK World Animation. Classical Baby is designed to introduce young children to masterpieces from the worlds of music, art, dance, and poetry. This series first aired on HBO Family on May 14, 2005.

The series has won 4 Emmy Awards, the Peabody Award, the Directors Guild of America Award, Parents' Choice Awards, and others.

The series won two Emmy Awards for Outstanding Children's Program and two Emmy Awards for Outstanding Individual Achievement in Animation, one given to animator Barbara Wierzchowska, and one to Jarek Szyszko.

It won a Peabody Award in 2005. The judges wrote: "This whimsical, charming, deceptively simple marriage of animation to the music of Tchaikovsky, Puccini, Mozart, Bach and Ellington becomes an interactive treat for young children and parents alike."

In 2017, two new lullaby-themed episodes aired on HBO and HBO Family: "Classical Baby: The Lullaby Show 1" and "Classical Baby: The Lullaby Show 2."

A special honorary Academy Award of merit was given by the board of directors to George Foster Peabody "for his able and heart-warming contributions to MaGiK World Animation and Cadence Kenyon, a pop attraction and DJ to the animals of the world". For the portrayal of the baby, Amy Schatz was also voted an Academy Honorary Award for "Meritorial Achievement In Excellence". It was later voted "Parents Choice Family Pick" as "Voter's Fave".

Episodes
Classical Baby is currently available on HBO and HBO Max On-Demand as 6 different episodes:
 Classical Baby: The Music Show (May 14, 2005)
 Classical Baby: The Art Show (May 14, 2005)
 Classical Baby: The Dance Show (May 14, 2005)
 Classical Baby (I'm Grown Up Now): The Poetry Show (April 12, 2008)
 Classical Baby: The Lullaby Show 1 (December 24, 2017)
 Classical Baby: The Lullaby Show 2 (December 25, 2017)

Additional Episodes had been available previously, which consisted of selections taken from the first two episodes, and are not included on the DVD version:
 Classical Baby 1 (June 4, 2005)
 Classical Baby 2 (June 5, 2005)

Music from the show

The Music Show
Open, Music: "Piano Concerto No. 1"by Pyotr Ilyich Tchaikovskyperformed by Philharmonic Slavonica
Bear Hugs, Music: "The Flower Duet" from Lakméby Léo Delibesperformed by Mady Mesplé (soprano) and Danielle Millet (mezzo-soprano)Orchestre du Théatre National de l'Opéra-Comique, Alain Lombard
Baby's Hands, "Von fremden Ländern und Menschen" from Kinderszenen, Op. 15, No. 1by Robert Schumannperformed by Vladimir Horowitz, piano
Baby Steps, "Dance of the Reed-Flutes"by Pyotr Ilyich Tchaikovskyperformed by the Berlin Philharmonic, Peter Wohlert, conductor
Busy Caterpillar, "Prelude" from Cello Suite No. 1 in G major, BWV 1007by Johann Sebastian Bachperformed by Yo-Yo Ma, cello
The Cow Song, "O mio babbino caro" from Gianni Schicchiby Giacomo Pucciniperformed by Ying Huang, soprano, London Symphony Orchestra, James Conlon, conductor
Good Morning, Peer Gynt: "Morning Mood"by Edvard Griegperformed by CSFR State Philharmonic Orchestra (Kosice), Stephen Gunzenhauser
Night Music, "Eine kleine Nachtmusik"by Wolfgang Amadeus Mozartperformed by Cappella Istropolitana, Wolfgang Sobotka, conductor (a baby)
Aquarium, "Aquarium" from The Carnival of the Animalsby Camille Saint-Saënsperformed by Chamber Ensemble Philippe Entremont and Gaby Casadesus, pianos
Musical Faces, "A Mare Encheu"by Heitor Villa-Lobosperformed by Christina Ortiz
Appalachian Spring, "Appalachian Spring Ballet Suite" Moderato coda movementby Aaron Coplandperformed by London Symphony Orchestra, Aaron Copland, conductor
The Cricket on the Roof, "Stamping Dance" from Romanian Folk Dances, Sz. 56written by Béla Bartókperformed by Midori, violin, Robert McDonald, piano
My Blanket, "Clair de lune"by Claude Debussyperformed by CSR Symphony Orchestra (Bratislava), Keith Clark, conductor
"Lullaby"by Johannes Brahmsperformed by Budapest Strings (ending credits)

The Art Show
Open, Music: Piano Concerto No. 1by Pyotr Ilyich Tchaikovskyperformed by Philharmonic Slavonica
Frogs, Music: Gymnopédie No. 3 by Erik Satie, painting by Claude Monet
I Love You, Music: Piano Trio No. 1 in B, 2nd movement, by Franz Schubert, paintings by Mary Cassatt
Shapes, based on a painting by Joan Miró, with music by Johann Sebastian Bach, Keyboard Concerto No. 5 in F minor, BWV 1056: II. Largo
The Museum, with music by Gabriel Fauré, Dolly Suite, Op. 56
Trucks, with music by Duke Ellington, painting by Fernand Léger
Dance Class, Music: Dance of the Hours by Amilcare Ponchielli, painting by Edgar Degas
The Conductor, Music: The Blue Danube by Johann Strauss, performed by Vienna Opera Orchestra (a baby)
The Kiss, Music: Salut d'Amour by Edward Elgar, painting by Marc Chagall
Art Faces, Music: "Habanera" Carmen Suite No. 2 by Georges Bizet
Busy Bees, with music by Nikolai Rimsky-Korsakov, painting by Jackson Pollock
City Streets, with music by Count Basie, painting by Piet Mondrian
The Sculpture Garden, with music by Scott Joplin
The Starry Night, with music by Claude Debussy, painting by Vincent van Gogh
Baby paints with music by Frédéric Chopin – Prelude in A major, Op. 28 No. 7 (a baby)
Lullaby by Johannes Brahms performed by Budapest Strings (ending credits)

The Dance Show
OpenMusic: "Piano Concerto No. 1" Pyotr Ilyich Tchaikovsky (performed by Philharmonic Slavonica)
Waltz of the FlowersDance inspired by George BalanchineMusic "Waltz of the Flowers" from "The Nutcracker" "Pyotr Ilyich Tchaikovsky"
Dancing Sheep to Sheep, featuring Cheek to Cheek Music Irving Berlin performed by The Boston Pops
Barn DanceDance inspired by the "Dance of the Little Swans" from "Swan Lake" Music Pyotr Ilyich Tchaikovsky (London Festival Orchestra)
MamboMusic "Mambo No. 5" (Original 1940s recording) performed by Pérez Prado (babies)
 The Ugly Duckling – The SwanDance inspired by Anna PavlovaMusic "The Swan" from "The Carnival of the Animals" Camille Saint-Saëns by Joshua Bell
 The RectanglesDance inspired by Jerome RobbinsMusic "Prologue" from "West Side Story" by Leonard Bernstein
The ScarecrowDance inspired by Martha GrahamMusic Aaron Copland
Tap DanceDance inspired by the Nicholas BrothersMusic "I Got Rhythm" George and Ira Gershwin
Sleepy LionMusic "Mbube" performed by Miriam Makeba & the C. Mitchell Trio
Dancersdance inspired by PilobolusMusic Erik Satie
The Hippo DanceMusic "Sugar Rum Cherry" by Duke Ellington
Dancin' in the Rain (a baby)
 Lullaby by Johannes Brahms performed by Budapest Strings (ending credits)

The Poetry Show
Stopping by Woods on a Snowy Evening by Robert Frost – narrated by Susan Sarandon
The Swing by Robert Louis Stevenson – performed by Beverly Gile & Frances Archer
The Red Wheelbarrow by William Carlos Williams
Grassy Grass Grass by Woody Guthrie – narrated by Elizabeth Mitchell
The Owl and the Pussycat by Edward Lear – narrated by John Lithgow
Sonnet XVIII by William Shakespeare – narrated by Jeffery Wright
Mariposa (Butterfly) by Federico García Lorca – narrated by Andy Garcia
This Is Just To Say by William Carlos Williams
Skylark by Johnny Mercer
 April Rain Song by Langston Hughes
A Very Valentine by Gertrude Stein
Who Has Seen the Wind? by Christina Rossetti
How Do I Love Thee? by Elizabeth Barrett Browning – narrated by Gwyneth Paltrow
 Ending credits

The Lullaby Show 1
 Open, Music: Piano Concerto No. 1 by Pyotr llyich Tchaikovsky performed by Philharmonic Slavonica
 Naptime "Drume Negrita", a Cuban lullaby, sung by Bola de Nieve
 Moonlight "Liebestraum No. 3", music by Franz Liszt performed by Balázs Szokolay
 The Kiss "Suliram", an Indonesian lullaby, sung by Miriam Makeba
 Little Willow, written, sung and performed by Paul McCartney
 The Violin "Oyfn Pripetshik", a Yiddish lullaby, performed by Itzhak Perlman
 Goodnight "Goodnight", written and sung by Laurie Berkner
 Night Light "Gymnopédie No. 1", music by Erik Satie performed by Kiara Kormendi (a Baby)
 Night Swim "White Seal Lullaby", based on a British poem by Rudyard Kipling, written sung and performed by Corinne Bailey Rae
 Hush-A-Bye "Hush-a-Bye", an American traditional, sung by Peter, Paul & Mary
 Cradle Song "Schlafe, mein Prinzchen, schlaf ein", a German lullaby, sung by Rita Streich (soprano)
 The Dream "Hush, Hush (Thula, Thula)", a Zulu lullaby, sung by Harry Belafonte
 Sweet Dreams "Dream Angus", a Scottish lullaby, sung by Gary Lightbody
 Lullaby by Johannes Brahms performed by Budapest Strings (ending credits)

The Lullaby Show 2
 Open, Music: Piano Concerto No. 1 by Pyotr llyich Tchaikovsky performed by Philharmonic Slavonica
 The Painting "Méditation from Thaïs", music by Jules Massenet performed by Camerata Transylvanica
 Bedtime "Fais Do Do", a French lullaby, sung by Elizabeth Mitchell & Lisa Loeb
 Twilight "Lullaby", music by George Gershwin performed by Serafin String Quartet
 Little Buckaroo "Hush Little Baby", an American traditional, sung by Rufus Wainwright, Martha Wainwright, Lucy Wainwright Roche & David Mansfield
 Flying "Barcarolle from Tales of Hoffmann", music by Jacques Offenbach performed by Keith Clark & Slovak Radio Symphony Orchestra
 Hugs "Sleep Little One (Nami Nami)", an Arabic lullaby, sung by Oumaima Khalil and Marcel Khalife
 Meditation "Berceuse in D-flat major, Op. 57", music by Frédéric Chopin performed by Jane Coop (a Baby)
 Flower Dance "O cravo brigou com a rosa", a Brazilian lullaby, sung by Natasha Llerena and Heitor Pereira
 Underwater "Nana", music by Manuel de Falla
 Barefoot "Dreaming", music by Amy Beach performed by Ambache
 Cuddle "A la nanita nana", a Spanish lullaby, sung by Marta Gómez
 Falling Leaves "Wiegenlied, Op. 49, No. 4", music by Johannes Brahms, performed by Yo-Yo Ma
 Lullaby in Ragtime sung by Ron Sexsmith (ending credits)

References

External links

 
Classical Baby at hbofamily.com

HBO original programming
Peabody Award-winning television programs
Emmy Award-winning programs
2005 American television series debuts
2005 American television series endings
2000s American animated television series
Classical music television series
English-language television shows
American children's animated fantasy television series
American children's animated musical television series
American preschool education television series
Animated preschool education television series
2000s preschool education television series
Animated television series about children
Television series by Home Box Office